Mongolabis is a genus of earwigs in the subfamily Anisolabidinae. It was cited by Srivastava in Part 2 of Fauna of India.

References

External links
 The Earwig Research Centre's Mongolabis database Source for references: type Mongolabis in the "genus" field and click "search".

Anisolabididae
Dermaptera genera